The Core 2 brand refers to Intel's x86 and x86-64 processors with the Core microarchitecture made for the consumer and business markets (except servers) above Pentium. The Core 2 Solo branch covered single-core CPUs for notebook computers, Core 2 Duo – dual-core CPUs for desktop and notebook computers, Core 2 Quad – quad-core CPUs for desktop and notebook computers, and Core 2 Extreme – dual-core and quad-core CPUs for desktop and notebook computers.

Desktop processors

Dual-Core Desktop processors

Core 2 Duo

"Allendale" (65 nm, 800 MT/s)  

All models support: MMX, SSE, SSE2, SSE3, SSSE3, Enhanced Intel SpeedStep Technology (EIST), Intel 64, XD bit (an NX bit implementation), Intel Active Management Technology (iAMT2)
 Die size: 111 mm2
 Steppings: L2, M0, G0

Note: The M0 and G0 Steppings have better optimizations to lower idle power consumption from 12W to 8W.

Note: The E4700 uses G0 Stepping which makes it a Conroe CPU.

"Conroe" (65 nm, 1066 MT/s)  

All models support: MMX, SSE, SSE2, SSE3, SSSE3, Enhanced Intel SpeedStep Technology (EIST), Intel 64, XD bit (an NX bit implementation), Intel Active Management Technology (iAMT2)
 All models support: Intel VT-x
 Die size: 143 mm2
 Steppings: B2, G0

Note: of the E6000 series processors, only models E6550, E6750, and E6850 support Intel's Trusted Execution Technology (TXT).

Note: The L2 Stepping, and models with sSpec SL9ZL, SL9ZF, SLA4U, SLA4T, have better optimizations to lower idle power consumption from 22W to 12W.

Note: The M0 and G0 Steppings have better optimizations to lower idle power consumption from 12W to 8W.

"Conroe" (65 nm, 1333 MT/s)  

All models support: MMX, SSE, SSE2, SSE3, SSSE3, Enhanced Intel SpeedStep Technology (EIST), Intel 64, XD bit (an NX bit implementation), Intel Active Management Technology (iAMT2)
 All models support: Intel VT-x
 All E6x50 models support: Intel VT-x, Trusted Execution Technology (TXT)
 Die size: 143 mm2
 Transistor count: 291 million
 Steppings: B2, G0

Note: of the E6000 series processors, only models E6550, E6750, and E6850 support Intel's Trusted Execution Technology (TXT).

Note: The L2 Stepping, and models with sSpec SL9ZL, SL9ZF, SLA4U, SLA4T, have better optimizations to lower idle power consumption from 22W to 12W.

Note: The M0 and G0 Steppings have better optimizations to lower idle power consumption from 12W to 8W.

"Conroe-CL" (65 nm, 1066 MT/s)

All models support: MMX, SSE, SSE2, SSE3, SSSE3, Enhanced Intel SpeedStep Technology (EIST), Intel 64, XD bit (an NX bit implementation), Intel Active Management Technology (iAMT2), Intel VT-x, Trusted Execution Technology (TXT)
 Die size: 111 mm2 (Conroe)
 Steppings: ?

"Wolfdale-3M" (45 nm, 1066 MT/s)
 All models support: MMX, SSE, SSE2, SSE3, SSSE3, SSE4.1, Enhanced Intel SpeedStep Technology (EIST), Intel 64, XD bit (an NX bit implementation), Intel Active Management Technology (iAMT2)
 Die size: 82 mm2
 Transistor Count: 230 million
 Steppings: M0, R0
 Models with a part number ending in "ML" instead of "M" support Intel VT-x

"Wolfdale" (45 nm, 1333 MT/s)
All models(except E8190) support: MMX, SSE, SSE2, SSE3, SSSE3, SSE4.1, Enhanced Intel SpeedStep Technology (EIST), Intel 64, XD bit (an NX bit implementation), iAMT2 (Intel Active Management Technology), Intel VT-x , Intel VT-d , Trusted Execution Technology (TXT)
 Die size: 107 mm2
 Transistor Count: 410 million
 Steppings: C0, E0

Note: The E8190 and E8290 do not support Intel VT-d.

See also: Versions of the same Wolfdale core in an LGA 771 are available under the Dual-Core Xeon brand.

Core 2 Extreme

"Conroe XE" (65 nm)

These models feature an unlocked clock multiplier
All models support: MMX, SSE, SSE2, SSE3, SSSE3, Enhanced Intel SpeedStep Technology (EIST), Intel 64, XD bit (an NX bit implementation), Intel Active Management Technology (iAMT2), Intel VT-x, Trusted Execution Technology (TXT)
 Die size: 143 mm2
 Steppings: B1, B2
 The X6900 was never publicly released.

Quad-Core Desktop processors

Core 2 Quad

"Kentsfield" (65 nm)

All models support: MMX, SSE, SSE2, SSE3, SSSE3, Enhanced Intel SpeedStep Technology (EIST), Intel 64, XD bit (an NX bit implementation), Intel Active Management Technology (iAMT2), Intel VT-x
 Die size: 2 ×143 mm2
 Steppings: B3, G0

"Yorkfield-6M" (45 nm)

All models support: MMX, SSE, SSE2, SSE3, SSSE3, SSE4.1, Enhanced Intel SpeedStep Technology (EIST), Intel 64, XD bit (an NX bit implementation), Intel Active Management Technology (iAMT2), Intel VT-x , Intel VT-d , Trusted Execution Technology (TXT) 
 Die size: 2 × 82 mm2
 Steppings: M0, M1, R0
 All Q8xxx models are Yorkfield-6M MCMs with only 2 × 2 MB L2 cache enabled.

Note: Q8200, Q8200S, Q8300 SLB5W does not support Intel VT-x.

Note: Q8200, Q8200S, Q8300, Q8400, Q8400S, Q9500 does not support Intel VT-d.

Note: Q8200, Q8200S, Q8300, Q8400, Q8400S does not support TXT.

Yorkfield (45 nm)

 All models support: MMX, SSE, SSE2, SSE3, SSSE3, SSE4.1, Enhanced Intel SpeedStep Technology (EIST), Intel 64, XD bit (an NX bit implementation), Intel Active Management Technology (iAMT2), Intel VT-x, Intel VT-d, Trusted Execution Technology (TXT)
 Die size: 2 × 107 mm2
 Steppings: C0, C1, E0

Core 2 Extreme

"Kentsfield XE" (65 nm)

These models feature an unlocked clock multiplier
All models support: MMX, SSE, SSE2, SSE3, SSSE3, Enhanced Intel SpeedStep Technology (EIST), Intel 64, XD bit (an NX bit implementation), Intel Active Management Technology (iAMT2), Intel VT-x
 Die size: 2 ×143 mm2
 Steppings: B3, G0

"Yorkfield XE" (45 nm)
These models feature an unlocked clock multiplier
All models support: MMX, SSE, SSE2, SSE3, SSSE3, SSE4.1, Enhanced Intel SpeedStep Technology (EIST), Intel 64, XD bit (an NX bit implementation), Intel Active Management Technology (iAMT2), Intel VT-x
 I/O Acceleration Technology (Intel I/OAT) supported by: QX9775
 Intel VT-d supported by: QX9650
 Die size: 2 × 107 mm2
 Steppings: C0, C1, E0
 The QX9750 was never publicly released. Engineering samples have surfaced along with claims that Intel gave them away to employees sometime in 2009.

Notebook (mobile) processors

Single-Core Notebook processors

Core 2 Solo

"Merom-L" (65 nm)  
All models support: MMX, SSE, SSE2, SSE3, SSSE3, Enhanced Intel SpeedStep Technology (EIST), Intel 64, XD bit (an NX bit implementation), Intel Active Management Technology (iAMT2), Intel VT-x, Trusted Execution Technology (TXT)
 Die size: 81 mm2
 Steppings: A1

"Penryn-L" (45 nm)  
 All models support: MMX, SSE, SSE2, SSE3, SSSE3, SSE4.1, Enhanced Intel SpeedStep Technology (EIST), Intel 64, XD bit (an NX bit implementation), Intel Active Management Technology (iAMT2), Intel VT-x, Trusted Execution Technology (TXT), Intel Dynamic Acceleration (IDA)
 Socket P processors can throttle the front-side bus (FSB) anywhere between 400 and 800 MT/s as needed.
 Die size: 82 mm2
 228 million transistors
 Package size: 22 mm × 22 mm
 Steppings: M0, R0

Dual-Core Notebook processors

Core 2 Duo

"Merom", "Merom-2M" (standard-voltage, 65 nm)  
All models support: MMX, SSE, SSE2, SSE3, SSSE3, Enhanced Intel SpeedStep Technology (EIST), Intel 64, XD bit (an NX bit implementation), Intel Active Management Technology (iAMT2)
 Model T7600G features an unlocked clock multiplier. Only sold OEM in the Dell XPS M1710.
 Intel VT-x: Supported by T5500 (L2), T5600 and all T7xxx
 Intel Dynamic Front Side Bus Frequency Switching: Supported by E1, G0, G2, M0 Steppings
 Socket P processors can throttle the front-side bus (FSB) anywhere between 400 and 800 MT/s as needed.
 Die size: 143 mm2 (Merom), 111 mm2 (Merom-2M)
 Steppings: B2, E1, G0, G2 (Merom), L2, M0 (Merom-2M)
 All models of stepping B2 released in July 2006, stepping L2 released in January 2007.

See also: Versions of the same Merom-2M core with half the L2 cache disabled are available under the Pentium Dual-Core brand.

"Merom" (low-voltage, 65 nm)
All models support: MMX, SSE, SSE2, SSE3, SSSE3, Enhanced Intel SpeedStep Technology (EIST), Intel 64, XD bit (an NX bit implementation), Intel Active Management Technology (iAMT2), Intel VT-x, Trusted Execution Technology (TXT)
 Intel Dynamic Front Side Bus Frequency Switching: Supported by E1, G0, G2 Steppings
 Die size: 143 mm2
 Steppings: B2, E1, G0, G2

"Merom-2M" (ultra-low-voltage, 65 nm)
All models support: MMX, SSE, SSE2, SSE3, SSSE3, Enhanced Intel SpeedStep Technology (EIST), Intel 64, XD bit (an NX bit implementation), Intel Active Management Technology (iAMT2), Intel VT-x
 Die size: 111 mm2
 Steppings: L2, M0

"Penryn" (Apple iMac specific, 45 nm)
 Die size: 107 mm2
 The 2008 20" iMac used the E8135 and E8335 CPUs at a lower than specified clock frequency, explaining why the same model is used at different frequencies. This list shows the frequencies used by Apple.
 Steppings: C0, E0

"Penryn", "Penryn-3M" (standard-voltage, 45 nm)  
All models support: MMX, SSE, SSE2, SSE3, SSSE3, SSE4.1, Enhanced Intel SpeedStep Technology (EIST), Intel 64, XD bit (an NX bit implementation), Intel Active Management Technology (iAMT2), Intel Dynamic Acceleration (IDA)
 T6570, T6670, all T8xxx and T9xxx models support Intel VT-x
 All T9xxx models support Trusted Execution Technology (TXT)
 T6xxx models are Penryn-3M processors with 1 MB L2 cache disabled.
Note that models T8100, T8300, T9300, T9500 are Penryn processors designed for Santa Rosa Refresh platforms with maximum FSB of 800 MT/s, whereas the rest of the Penryn processors are designed for Montevina platforms that can go up to maximum FSB of 1066 MT/s.

Penryn processors support Dynamic Front Side Bus Throttling between 400–800MT/s.
 Die size: 107 mm2 (Penryn), 82 mm2 (Penryn-3M)
 Steppings: C0, E0 (Penryn) M0, R0 (Penryn-3M)

"Penryn", "Penryn-3M" (medium-voltage, 45 nm)  
 All models support: MMX, SSE, SSE2, SSE3, SSSE3, SSE4.1, Enhanced Intel SpeedStep Technology (EIST), Intel 64, XD bit (an NX bit implementation), Intel Active Management Technology (iAMT2), Intel VT-x (except the non-Mac P7350, P7450), Trusted Execution Technology (TXT), Intel Dynamic Acceleration (IDA)
 Select Apple subsets of P7000 series processors support Intel VT-x.
 Penryn and Penryn-3M processors support Dynamic Front Side Bus Throttling between 533–1066MT/s.
 Die size: 107 mm2 (Penryn), 82 mm2 (Penryn-3M)
 Package size: 35 mm × 35 mm
 Transistors: 410 million 
 Steppings: (Core microarchitecture 45nm steppings) 
C0, E0 (Penryn) 
M0, R0 (Penryn-3M)
stepping C0/M0 is only used in the Intel Mobile 965 Express (Santa Rosa refresh) platform
stepping E0/R0 adds two new instructions (XSAVE/XRSTOR) and supports the later Intel Mobile 4 Express (Montevina) platform

"Penryn" (medium-voltage, 45 nm, Small Form Factor)

 All models support: MMX, SSE, SSE2, SSE3, SSSE3, SSE4.1, Enhanced Intel SpeedStep Technology (EIST), Intel 64, XD bit (an NX bit implementation), Intel Active Management Technology (iAMT2), Intel VT-x, Trusted Execution Technology (TXT), Intel Dynamic Acceleration (IDA)
 Die size: 107 mm2
 Package size: 22 mm × 22 mm
 Steppings: C0, E0

"Penryn" (low-voltage, 45 nm, Small Form Factor)

 All models support: MMX, SSE, SSE2, SSE3, SSSE3, SSE4.1, Enhanced Intel SpeedStep Technology (EIST), Intel 64, XD bit (an NX bit implementation), Intel Active Management Technology (iAMT2), Intel VT-x, Trusted Execution Technology (TXT), Intel Dynamic Acceleration (IDA)
 Die size: 107 mm2
 Package size: 22 mm × 22 mm
 Steppings: C0, E0

"Penryn-3M" (ultra-low-voltage, 45 nm, Small Form Factor)

 All models support: MMX, SSE, SSE2, SSE3, SSSE3, SSE4.1, Enhanced Intel SpeedStep Technology (EIST), Intel 64, XD bit (an NX bit implementation), Intel Active Management Technology (iAMT2), Intel VT-x, Trusted Execution Technology (TXT) (except SU7300), Intel Dynamic Acceleration (IDA)
 Die size: 107 mm2
 Package size: 22 mm × 22 mm
 Steppings: M0, R0

Core 2 Extreme

"Merom XE" (65 nm)  
These models feature an unlocked clock multiplier
All models support: MMX, SSE, SSE2, SSE3, SSSE3, Enhanced Intel SpeedStep Technology (EIST), Intel 64, XD bit (an NX bit implementation), Intel Active Management Technology (iAMT2), Intel VT-x, Trusted Execution Technology (TXT), Intel Dynamic Front Side Bus Frequency Switching
 Merom XE processors support Dynamic Front Side Bus Throttling between 400 and 800 MT/s.
 Die size: 143 mm2
 Steppings: E1, G0

"Penryn XE" (45 nm)  
These models feature an unlocked clock multiplier
All models support: MMX, SSE, SSE2, SSE3, SSSE3, SSE4.1, Enhanced Intel SpeedStep Technology (EIST), Intel 64, XD bit (an NX bit implementation), Intel Active Management Technology (iAMT2), Intel VT-x, Trusted Execution Technology (TXT)
 Penryn XE processors support Dynamic Front Side Bus Throttling between 400–800 MT/s and 533–1066 MT/s.
 Die size: 107 mm2
 Steppings: C0, E0

Quad-Core Notebook processors

Core 2 Quad

"Penryn QC" (45 nm)  
 All models support: MMX, SSE, SSE2, SSE3, SSSE3, SSE4.1, Enhanced Intel SpeedStep Technology (EIST), Intel 64, XD bit (an NX bit implementation), Intel Active Management Technology (iAMT2), Intel VT-x, Trusted Execution Technology (TXT)
 Can throttle the front-side bus (FSB) anywhere between 533–1066 MT/s as needed.
 Die size: 2 × 107 mm2
 Steppings: E0

Core 2 Extreme

"Penryn QC XE" (45 nm)  
 This model features an unlocked clock multiplier usually manipulated through the systems BIOS however some manufacturers (such as HP) do not have this feature enabled on their laptops that use this processor.
 All models support: MMX, SSE, SSE2, SSE3, SSSE3, SSE4.1, Enhanced Intel SpeedStep Technology (EIST), Intel 64, XD bit (an NX bit implementation), Intel Active Management Technology (iAMT2), Intel VT-x, Trusted Execution Technology (TXT)
 Can throttle the front-side bus (FSB) anywhere between 533 and 1066 MT/s as needed.
 Package size: 35 mm × 35 mm
 Die size: 2 × 107 mm2
 Steppings: E0

See also
Intel Core
Intel Core 2
Intel Core (microarchitecture)
Penryn (microarchitecture)
List of Intel Core microprocessors
List of Intel Core i3 microprocessors
List of Intel Core i5 microprocessors
List of Intel Core i7 microprocessors
List of Intel Core i9 microprocessors

References

ATI provides pointer to Intel's 'Allendale', 23 May 2006
Rumoured prices and specifications for Intel Core 2, 30 May 2006
TGDaily indicates leaked release dates, 24 July 2006
Intel to unveil five Merom CPUs in July, paper says as re-reported by DigiTimes, 17 July 2006
Intel Unveils World's Best Processor, 27 July 2006
Intel Takes Popular Laptops to 'Extreme' with First-Ever Extreme Edition Mobile Processor; Adds New Desktop Chip, 16 July 2007
CORE 2 DUO 1333 MHZ STEPPING, 18 July 2007

External links
 Search MDDS Database
 Intel ARK Database
SSPEC/QDF Reference (Intel)

Intel Core 2 Duo Processors Technical Documents

Core 2
Intel Core 2